Anu Ramdas (born 26 January 1980) is an artist, teacher and researcher based in Copenhagen, Denmark. She studied at The Royal Danish Academy of Fine Arts, the Department of Experimental Art at the Central Academy of Fine Arts in Beijing, China, and at Malmø Art Academy.

Ramdas´ work seems to always take its point of departure in lens-based technology unfolding her ideas through various mediums such as; sound, text, performance, drawing, film and photography. She employs advanced meditation techniques to access the multi-dimensional archive of her own unconscious mind and explores the complexity that lies between the idea and the sensed; negotiating the values of the detectable and the undetectable. In her series Parent Bodies she reads her own body as an agent of the light sensitive material and translates this data into hand drawn blueprints that serve for future three dimensional and time-based works. Through enigmatic objects and images, her visual thought experiments and cosmic messages remind us to see, feel, trust and listen beyond the vibrational frequencies of western principles but towards the beat of the cosmos, planet earth and our soul.  

She has done international residencies with La Wayaka Current in Armila, Panama (2018–19) SALT Beyoglu in Istanbul, Turkey (2013), Can Lis in Porto Petro, Spain (2013), and Bucharest AIR in Romania (2012).

In 2016 she collaborated with the Danish artist Christian Danielewitz on the project Against the Grain which addresses a very important topic; the relationship between our use of technology and the global strain on the environment which follows. The two Danish artists travelled to the industrial town of Baotou – the epicenter of the Chinese mining industry, in Inner Mongolia. Here they created the works on location, using radioactive material from the gigantic tailings dam Weikuang, situated on the outskirts of the city. Weikuang Dam is a nightmare landscape, which has formed as a result of the ruthless hunt for rare earth elements, the essential material basis of our high-tech societies. The project has been presented at Galleri Image, in Aarhus, Denmark (2016) Galleri [format] in Malmø, Sweden (2017) at Savvy Contemporary in Berlin, Germany (2019).

In 2016 she released the book Against the Grain and in 2014 White City / Black Desert – Black City / White Desert  in collaboration with Christian Danielewitz.

Since 2015, Anu Ramdas has held the position as an associate assistant at the laboratory of photography at The Royal Danish Academy of Fine Arts in Copenhagen.

Selected exhibitions 

 The Long Term You Cannot Afford, SAVVY Contemporary Berlin
 Floating Art 2019, Vejle Art Museum
 Against the Grain, Fotogalleriet [format] Malmø
 Against the Grain, Galleri Image Aarhus
 Mauna, Danske Grafikernes Hus Copenhagen
 Ung Dansk Fotografi '15, Fotografisk Center Copenhagen
 Koh-I-Noor, Den Frie -Center of Contemporary Art Copenhagen
 Hotel Ararat, Polistar Istanbul
 Light! More Light!, Atelier 35 Romania
 AFGANG '11, Nikolaj Contemporary Art Center Copenhagen
 798 Art Zone Beijing

External links 
 
Interview with Anu Ramdas - Yet Magazine

Notes 

 Anu Ramdas; Christian Danielewitz. Against the Grain. Antipyrine. 2016 
 Anu Ramdas; Christian Danielewitz. White City / Black Desert - Black City / White Desert. Forlagetasterisk. 
 Anu Ramdas. Travel Light. Piccadilly Expedition Company. Forlagetasterisk. 

1980 births
Living people
Artists from Copenhagen
21st-century Danish photographers
Danish photographers
Danish women artists
Interdisciplinary artists
Lund University alumni
Royal Danish Academy of Fine Arts alumni
Danish women photographers
21st-century women photographers